Lionel Rodrigo de la Serna (born 18 April 1976) is an Argentine actor. He is known for playing Alberto Granado in the 2004 biopic The Motorcycle Diaries and Palermo in the Netflix series Money Heist. His role in Money Heist as Martín Berrote (Palermo) is widely regarded as one of the best characters in the show by the fans.

Career
De la Serna started his career in several smaller productions like Same Love, Same Rain and Nuts for Love. In 2000, he portrayed Ricardo Riganti in the Canal 7 series Okupas, now considered an Argentine cult classic.

In 2004 starred in the biopic The Motorcycle Diaries for which he won a Silver Condor award for best actor, an Independent Spirit Award for "Best Debut Performance" and earned him a nomination for a BAFTA Award for Best Supporting Actor. He played the role of Alberto Granado, the travelling companion of Che Guevara during their 8-month long journey through South America.

Over the years he has starred in several Argentine television series such as El Puntero, Tiempos Compulsivos, Sol Negro and Contra las cuerdas, for which he was nominated and received several Martín Fierro Awards, an Argentine radio and television award.

In recent years he played a leading role in the historical film Revolución: El Cruce de los Andes focusing on José de San Martin and the Crossing of the Andes, Chiamatemi Francesco (Call Me Francis), an Italian biographical film about Pope Francis, and the 2018 Netflix comedy film Yucatán. He also starred in Camino a la paz (Path to Peace) and Cien años de perdón, which were both released internationally and de la Serna receiving a nomination for Best New Actor at the 31st Goya Awards for Cien años de perdón.

In 2019 he gained prominence by joining the cast of the successful Spanish television show Money Heist for its third part as the character Palermo. He resumed his role in part 4 which was released on Netflix in April 2020.

De la Serna also starred in a few theatre productions in Argentina including Lluvia Constante for which he won a Premio Florencio and most recently El Farmer in the Teatro La Comedia in Buenos Aires in 2019.

He is part of the music group El Yotivenco, which formed in 2005.

Personal life
De la Serna dated actress Érica Rivas from 1999 to 2010, whom he had one child. From 2016 to 2021, he dated journalist Ludmila Romero, with whom he had two children.

Filmography

References

External links
 
 

1976 births
20th-century Argentine male actors
21st-century Argentine male actors
Argentine male film actors
Argentine male television actors
Living people
Male actors from Buenos Aires